The Slack is a village in County Durham, England. It is situated near to Butterknowle, to the west of Bishop Auckland.

References

Villages in County Durham
Cockfield, County Durham